Those We Love is a 1932 American pre-Code film directed by Robert Florey. It was adapted by F. Hugh Herbert from the play by George Abbott and S.K. Lauren. The film was independently produced and distributed.

Plot
Kenneth MacKenna plays a young author who marries the woman (Mary Astor) who bought the first copy of his book. Their happy married life is later threatened by another woman (Lilyan Tashman).

Cast
 Mary Astor as May Ballard
 Kenneth MacKenna as Freddie Williston
 Lilyan Tashman as Valerie
 Hale Hamilton as Blake
 Earle Foxe as Bert Parker
 Forrester Harvey as Jake
 Virginia Sale as Bertha
 Pat O'Malley as Daley
 Harvey Clark as Mr. Hart
 Cecil Cunningham as Mrs. Henry Abbott
 Edwin Maxwell as Marshall

References

External links
 

1932 films
Films directed by Robert Florey
1932 drama films
American drama films
American black-and-white films
1930s American films